This is a listing/"catalogue raisonnė" of the works of the Maître de Laz. His work, dating to around 1527, can be seen in various parts of Brittany. He is unusual amongst sculptors in this region working in the 15th and 16th century in that he often worked using "grés feldspathique" as opposed to granite or kersanton stone. He executed pietàs in Laz, Finistère, Briec-de-l'Odet, Saint-Hernin and Plourac'h and in Plourac'h, he executed statuary for the parish church. Grés feldspathique had been used earlier in Laz in 1350 with a statue of a dying cavalier placed by the chevet of the Église Saint-Germain-et-Saint-Louis. It was also used by the Maître de Tronoën (Listing of the works of the atelier of the Maître de Tronoën) for the bas-relief in the entry to the old presbytery at Laz.

Calvaries

Further reading
"Sculpteurs sur pierre en Basse-Bretagne. Les Ateliers du XVe au XVIIe Siècle" by Emmanuelle LeSeac'h. Published by Presses Universitaires de Rennes.

References

Calvaries in Brittany
Buildings and structures in Finistère